The SAMIL 100 is an upgraded Magirus Deutz 320D22AL 6x6 10-ton (load) truck. Classified as a heavy truck, it is made of pressed steel with the cargo area (capable of carrying up to 50 passengers) having drop sides and a tailgate.

Variants
 10-ton cargo vehicle with 1.2-ton capacity crane mounted behind cab.

 Mine resistant cab based cargo vehicle
 Dump truck
 Fuel tanker
  Gun tractor
 Field kitchen
 Refrigerator truck
 Ambulance
 Recovery vehicle
 Carrier for 127mm multiple rocket launcher
 Carrier for a 23 mm anti-aircraft weapon system

Citations and References

Citations

Bibliography

Cold War military equipment of South Africa
Military vehicles introduced in the 1980s